Davison Alexander Dalziel, 1st Baron Dalziel of Wooler (17 October 1852 – 18 April 1928), known as Sir Davison Dalziel, Bt, between 1919 and 1928, was a British newspaper owner and Conservative Party politician. He sat in the House of Commons between 1910 and 1927, before a brief period in the House of Lords. He was the founder of Dalziel's News Agency.

Life
Dalziel was born in London, the son of Davison Octavian Dalziel and Helen Gaultier.

Dalziel moved to New South Wales to work as a journalist for the Sydney Echo. He also spent several years in the United States in the management department of various newspapers, and when he returned to England in 1890 he set up his own business, Dalziel's News Agency. With partners he bought controlling stakes in The Standard and Evening Standard newspapers in 1910. He sold off his newspaper interests to further his work in the cab industry, setting up several companies including General Motor Cab Company Ltd, the Pullman Car Company and the International Sleeping Car Share Trust Ltd.

At the January 1910 general election he was elected as the Member of Parliament (MP) for Brixton,
holding the seat until his defeat at the 1923 general election. He was created a baronet in 1919.

He regained the Brixton seat in 1924, and held it for a further three years until his resignation from the House of Commons on 9 June 1927, by taking the Chiltern Hundreds

In 1927 he was raised to the peerage as Baron Dalziel of Wooler, of Wooler in the County of Northumberland.

Personal life

He married Harriet, daughter of J. G. Dunning, in 1876.

Dalziel died on 18 April 1928, aged 75, when the baronetcy and barony became extinct. In his will, which was only 140 words long, he left over £2,250,000 to Lady Dalziel, who herself died on 7December 1938.

He is buried in a family mausoleum in the eastern section of Highgate Cemetery in north London, close to the main entrance.

References

External links 

1852 births
1928 deaths
Burials at Highgate Cemetery
Dalziel of Wooler, Davizon Dalziel, 1st Baron
Conservative Party (UK) MPs for English constituencies
UK MPs 1910
UK MPs 1910–1918
UK MPs 1918–1922
UK MPs 1922–1923
UK MPs 1924–1929
UK MPs who were granted peerages
Grand Officiers of the Légion d'honneur
Barons created by George V